The Persian Princess or Persian Mummy is a mummy of an alleged Persian princess who surfaced in Pakistani Baluchistan in October 2000. After considerable attention and further investigation, the mummy proved to be an archaeological forgery and possibly a murder victim.

Discovery
The mummy was found on October 19, 2000. During a murder investigation, Pakistani authorities were alerted to a videotape recorded by Ali Aqbar, in which he claimed to have a mummy for sale. When questioned by the police, Aqbar told them where the mummy was located; at the house of tribal leader Wali Mohammed Reeki in Kharan, Baluchistan near the border of Afghanistan. Reeki claimed he had received the mummy from an Iranian named Sharif Shah Bakhi, who had said that he had found it after an earthquake near Quetta. The mummy had been put up for sale in the black antiquities market for 600 million rupees, the equivalent of $11 million. Reeki and Aqbar were accused of violating the country's Antiquities Act, a charge which carries a maximum sentence of ten years in prison.

Misidentification
In a press conference on October 26, Pakistani archaeologist Ahmad Hasan Dani of Islamabad's Quaid-e-Azam University announced that the mummy seemed to be a princess dated circa 600 BC. The mummy was wrapped in ancient Egyptian style, and rested in a gilded wooden coffin with cuneiform carvings inside a stone sarcophagus. The coffin had been carved with a large faravahar image. The mummy was atop a layer of wax and honey, was covered by a stone slab and had a golden crown on its brow. An inscription on the golden chest plate claimed that she was the relatively unknown Rhodugune, a daughter of king Xerxes I of Persia and a member of the Achaemenid dynasty.

Hasan Dani speculated that she might have been an Egyptian princess married to a Persian prince, or a daughter of the Achaemenid king Cyrus the Great. However, because mummification had been primarily an Egyptian practice, they had not encountered any mummies in Persia before.

Ownership
The governments of Iran and Pakistan soon began to argue about the ownership of the mummy. The Iranian Cultural Heritage Organization claimed her as a member of Persian royal family and demanded the mummy's return. Pakistan's Archaeological Department HQ said that it belonged to Pakistan because it had been found in Baluchistan. The Taliban of Afghanistan also made a claim. People in Quetta demanded that the police should return the mummy to them.

In November 2000, the mummy was placed in display in the National Museum of Pakistan.

Investigation
News of the Persian Princess prompted American archaeologist Oscar White Muscarella to describe an incident the previous March when he was shown photographs of a similar mummy. Amanollah Riggi, a middleman working on behalf of an unidentified antiquities dealer in Pakistan, had approached him, claiming its owners were a Zoroastrian family who had brought it to the country. The seller had claimed that it was a daughter of Xerxes, based on a translation of the cuneiform of the breastplate.

The cuneiform text on the breastplate contained a passage from the Behistun inscription in western Iran. The Behistun inscription was carved during the reign of Darius, the father of Xerxes. When the dealer's representative had sent a piece of a coffin to be carbon dated, analysis had shown that the coffin was only around 250 years old. Muscarella had suspected a forgery and severed contact. He had informed Interpol through the FBI.

When Asma Ibrahim, the curator of the National Museum of Pakistan, studied the item in police custody, she realised that the corpse was not as old as the coffin. The body had shown signs of decomposition fungus on the face, a sign of a recently deceased body, and the mat below the body was about five years old. During the investigation, Iran and the Taliban repeated their demands. The Taliban claimed that they had apprehended the smugglers that had taken the mummy out of Afghanistan.

The inscriptions on the breastplate were not in proper grammatical Persian. Instead of a Persian form of the daughter's name, Wardegauna, the forgers had used a Greek version Rhodugune. CAT and X-ray scans in Agha Khan Hospital indicated that the mummification had not been made following ancient Egyptian custom – for example, the heart had been removed along with the rest of the internal organs, whereas the heart of a genuine Egyptian mummy would normally be left inside the body. Furthermore, tendons that should have decayed over the centuries were still intact.

Ibrahim published her report on April 17, 2001. In it, she stated that the "Persian princess" was in fact a woman about 21–25 years of age, who had died around 1996, possibly killed with a blunt instrument to the lower back/pelvic region (e.g., hit by vehicle from behind). A subsequent accelerator mass spectrometry dating also confirmed the mummy's status as a modern fake. Her teeth had been removed after death, and her hip joint, pelvis and backbone damaged, before the body had been filled with powder. Police began to investigate a possible murder and arrested a number of suspects in Baluchistan.

Fate
The Edhi Foundation took custody of the body, and on August 5, 2005, announced that it was to be interred with proper burial rites. However, police and other government officials never responded to numerous requests, and it was not until 2008 that the foundation finally carried out the burial.

Representations in contemporary art
The Persian Princess is the name of an exhibition presented in August 2016 in Jerusalem, by artist Hili Greenfeld. The exhibition functions as a tribute to the anonymous woman who, in an instant, went from the status of a Princess in a gold-plated coffin displayed in a national museum, to the victim of a vicious murder in whom everyone quickly lost interest. The extreme transformation of the perception of the archeological object – from an honored Princess to a woman who was murdered – is what interests Greenfeld.
 
Greenfeld picked up the signs and symbols used by the forgers, such as engraved rosettes, Cypress gold, the icon of Ahura Mazda, Gold Crown, etc. She painted the symbols on artificial grass, and created a hybrid of lyrical abstract paintings, Persian rugs and graffiti murals. The works that are shown on the walls and on the floor seem to be graffiti murals and then seem to be rugs, but in both cases they are synthetic imitations of the original.

See also
List of unsolved murders

References

1970s births
1990s deaths
2000 hoaxes
2000 in Pakistan
Archaeological forgeries
Female murder victims
History of Balochistan, Pakistan (1947–present)
Hoaxes in Pakistan
Mummies
Unidentified murder victims